The women's 10 kilometres walk event at the 1998 Commonwealth Games was held on 19 September in Kuala Lumpur.

Results

References

10
1998
1998 in women's athletics